A Winter's Tale (in Swedish: ; subtitled: Four Vignettes after Shakespeare), Op. 18, is a four-movement suite for orchestra written from 1937 to 1938 by Swedish composer Lars-Erik Larsson. The Epilogue (No. 4) is often performed and recorded as a stand-alone concert piece.

Background
Beginning in 1937, the Swedish Broadcasting Corporation—the country's national, publicly funded radio—employed Larsson as a composer-in-residence, music producer, and conductor; his main task was to write music to accompany various radio programs. One of Larsson's colleagues was the Swedish poet Hjalmar Gullberg, who had joined Swedish Radio the year before and headed its drama division. Together, the two men developed a genre of popular entertainment they called the "lyrical suite", which alternated recited poetry with musical interludes. Larsson's first commission of this type was to compose four orchestral vignettes to accompany the 1938 radio recitation of a Swedish-language translation Shakespeare's The Winter's Tale; he subsequently published these as A Winter's Tale.

Structure
A Winter's Tale, which lasts about 9 to 10 minutes, is in four movements. They are as follows:

Instrumentation
A Winter's Tale is scored the following instruments:

Woodwinds: 2 flutes, 2 oboes, 2 clarinets (in B), and 2 bassoons
Brass: 2 horns (in F), 2 trumpets (in C), and trombone
Percussion: timpani
Strings: violins, violas, cellos, double basses, and harp

 published the suite in 1945.

Recordings
The sortable table below lists commercially available recordings of A Winter's Tale:

Notes, references, and sources

 
 
 
 

Compositions by Lars-Erik Larsson
20th-century classical music
Classical music in Sweden
1938 compositions
Orchestral suites